Álvaro Jardón (born November 13, 1977 in Oviedo, Asturias) is a Spanish bassist, who played in the Power metal bands WarCry and Darna.

Career
In 1997, when Jardón was 19, he met Víctor García and joined him to form part of WarCry. The next year, after their recording of the album "Llanto De Un Héroe", Víctor left to be a part of Avalanch. Warcry was unsuccessful after Victor left, so a year later Jardón joined Darna.

They recorded their self-titled debut album "Darna" in May 2001. After working with Darna for three years and sharing the stage with bands like Dark Moor and Ñu, Víctor García asked him to join WarCry once again. They rejoined and recorded their second album, "El Sello De Los Tiempos".

Discography

Darna 
 Darna (2002)

WarCry 
 2002 — El Sello De Los Tiempos
 2004 — Alea Jacta Est

References

External links
 Álvaro's biography 

1977 births
Living people
WarCry (band) members
People from Asturias
People from Oviedo